The right to an adequate standard of living is a fundamental human right. It is part of the Universal Declaration of Human Rights that was accepted by the General Assembly of the United Nations on December 10, 1948.

Furthermore, it has been written down in article 11 of the United Nations' International Covenant on Economic, Social and Cultural Rights.

The predecessor of this right, the Freedom from Want, is one of the Four Freedoms that American President Franklin D. Roosevelt spoke out at his State of the Union of January 6, 1941. According to Roosevelt it is a right every human being everywhere in the world should have. Roosevelt described his third right as follows:

See also 
Economic, social and cultural rights
Human right to water and sanitation

References 

Human rights
Socioeconomics